Nouri Abusahmain (born October 25, 1956) is a Libyan politician. He is a major figure on the Islamist side of the 2014 Libyan Conflict and founder of the LROR group which is considered "terrorist" by the internationally recognized Libyan parliament. He is reported to have rigged proceedings of the General National Congress while serving as its president.

Biography 
He was originally elected to the GNC as member for Zuwarah. He had some support from the Muslim Brotherhood, but stood as an independent candidate. He has denied strong links with the Muslim Brotherhood.

In 2013, he was the Islamist candidate for president of the Libyan General National Congress, but was considered a compromise candidate acceptable to more liberal members of the congress. As a result, he became GNC president on 25 June 2013. He had the support of the Muslim Brotherhood's party, the Justice and Construction Party, in his election. On becoming GNC president, Abusahmain was the first Libyan Berber to attain a national leadership role since the Tripolitanian Republic of 1918–22. Abusahmain immediately set up an Islamist armed group, the LROR, which attempted an Islamist coup in October 2013. He suppressed debates and inquiries which the Islamist part of the GNC did not want, including a debate over his alleged illegal diversion of money towards the LROR.

During Abusahmain's presidency of the GNC and subsequent to GNC's decision to enforce sharia law in December 2013, gender segregation and compulsory hijab were being imposed in Libyan universities from early 2014, provoking strong criticism from Women's Rights groups.

He played a part in the constitutional crisis which emerged when Islamist Ahmed Maiteeq was supposedly elected prime minister in a GNC session in April 2014 which was intimidated by armed Islamist militants bursting into parliament. Although the Deputy Speaker, Justice Ministry, Supreme Court and opposition parties rejected the proceedings as illegal, Abusahmain signed a decree confirming Maiteeq

According to supporters of the eastern government, his term ended when the new House of Representatives was established on 4 August 2014. He was succeeded by Abu Bakr Baira, the interim head of new parliament.
He was also GNC representative for his Berber hometown of Zuwarah, in the west of the country.

References 

|-

1956 births
Berber people
Heads of state of Libya
Libyan Islamists
Living people
Members of the General National Congress of Libya
People from Nuqat al Khams District